Jean-Fabrice Augustin is a Mauritian international footballer who plays for La Cure Sylvester as a defender.

Career
He has played club football for La Cure Sylvester.

He made his international debut for Mauritius in 2017.

International goals
Scores and results list Mauritius' goal tally first.

References

Year of birth missing (living people)
Living people
Mauritian footballers
Mauritius international footballers
Association football defenders